Triathlon at the 2017 Central American Games was held at the San Juan del Sur, Nicaragua from 16 December to 17 December. Both men and women competed in individual events, plus a mixed-gendered relay event.

The individual triathlon contained three components: a 1.5 km swim, 40 km cycle, and a 10 km run. The relay event featured teams of four competitors, where each completed a 300 m swim, a 6.3 km cycle, and a 2.1 km run.

Participating nations
A total of 37 athletes from 7 nations competed in triathlon at the 2017 Central American Games

Schedule

Medalists

Medal table

References

Central American Games